The 1951 New York Yanks season was their second as the Yanks (previously being the New York Bulldogs), and their final season before the franchise was sold and moved to Dallas. The team failed to improve on their previous season's output of 7–5, winning only one game. They played eight of their twelve games on the road, including seven of the first eight. The sole victory came at Green Bay in early December.

The baseball Yankees had the rights to  Yankee Stadium, so the football Yanks were forced to move their first two home games  onto the road, which were both  The World Series concluded in six games on October 10 and the first home football game came in week five on 

After the season, the erratic franchise was sold again to a consortium from Dallas, where the players and assets became known as the Texans, using the blue and white color scheme and carrying on the franchise’s legacy of the Dayton Triangles, the final remaining Ohio League founding APFA member.

Regular season

Schedule

Standings

References

1951
New York Yanks
New York Yanks